St Michael's Hospital is a National Health Service psychiatric hospital situated in Warwick, Warwickshire, England run by Coventry and Warwickshire Partnership NHS Trust.

History
The hospital was established in 1995, largely to replace the outdated Central Hospital in the nearby village of Hatton. The hospital was officially opened by the Queen on 8 November 1996. A new psychotherapy unit known as The Pines (the wards are generally named after trees) opened at the hospital in April 2004.

Services
There is an Education Centre Library and tennis court on site.

Gallery

See also
 List of hospitals in England

References

External links
 Official site

Hospital buildings completed in 1995
NHS hospitals in England
Hospitals in Warwickshire
Psychiatric hospitals in England
Buildings and structures in Warwick